UUTool was a freeware application written for the Apple Macintosh by Bernie Wieser.  The purpose of UUTool was to uuencode and uudecode files, however, the application functionality grew to translate uLaw encoded files to AIFF format, segment large uuencoded files, and recombine multiple uuencoded files for decode.

Technical details
UUTool uuencoded files and attached the  extension.
However, UUTool was the first Macintosh program that encoded the data fork, resource fork, and finder information into one uuencoded file with the  extension.  The format for this was to catenate the three pieces of file information and uniquely name the resource fork and finder info as files.  This allowed for some interoperability on non-Macintosh platforms.

Example
begin 0700 myfile
...
end
begin 0700 .rsrc
...
end
begin 0700 .finfo
...
end

Version history

See also
uuencoding
Pictures FAQ
Center for the History of Music Theory and Literature
BinHex
StuffIt

References

External links
 http://www.chebucto.ns.ca/Services/PDA/MacCompression.shtml

Classic Mac OS software